Rebelde (Edição Brasil) (English: Rebel (Brazil Edition) and also known as Rebelde (Edição Português) (EN: Rebel (Portuguese Edition) in 2020 limited version) is the first Brazilian Portuguese studio album of Mexican pop band RBD. The album is also the Brazilian version of RBD's Multi-Platinum Spanish language debut, Rebelde (2004). The album includes seven tracks recorded in Portuguese from their original Spanish-language versions, and four Spanish tracks taken from the original version of the album. The album was very popular in Brazil, selling more than 250,000 copies there and reaching Double platinum in the country.

Promo singles
Three singles were released as part of the album's promotion. The first single was the title track "Rebelde", which was launched in August 2005. The second single was released in July 2005, and was titled "Fique Em Silêncio". Finally, in January 2006, the third and final single off the album was released, the ballad "Salva-Me".

Production and recording 
With the broadcast of the telenovela Rebelde through the SBT television network in Brazil and the great success that the youthful plot was having on its likewise young demographic, SBT's production team had the idea to add support with a soundtrack of RBD's songs in Portuguese. The production first resolved to dub RBD's original Spanish songs by their own selected vocalists, but the attempt was not well received by the public, so it did not move forward.

Some time later the SBT production team decided to attempt the project again, but only this time the soundtrack's vocals would be sung by the members of RBD themselves. This was made possible through training the band members in the Portuguese language, and recording was done while the group was still filming the telenovela.

The album contains the songs that form part of the soundtrack of the telenovela Rebelde (2005), broadcast in Brazil. The songs were translated and adapted by Cláudio Rabello, under the direction of the original album's executive producer, Pedro Damián. The album was released in association with SBT Music and the EMI label on November 1, 2005.

Track listing

Translated songs
The tracks that were translated and recorded in Portuguese from their original Spanish language versions in the original album Rebelde (2004) are:
"Rebelde" ("Rebelde")
"Fique Em Silêncio" ("Sólo Quédate En Silencio")
"Um Pouco Desse Amor" ("Un Poco De Tu Amor")
"Ensina-Me" ("Enséñame")
"Querer-Te" ("Tenerte Y Quererte")
"Quando O Amor Acaba" ("Cuando El Amor Se Acaba")
"Salva-Me" ("Sálvame")

Charts

Year-end chart

Release history

References

RBD albums
2005 albums